Odongk District is a district located in Kampong Speu Province in central Cambodia.

Administration
Odongk District is subdivided into 15 communes (khum)

References

Districts of Kampong Speu province